Skyttea ochrolechiae is a species of lichenicolous (lichen-dwelling) fungus in the family Cordieritidaceae. Found in Japan, it was formally described as a new species in 2015 by Russian mycologist Mikhail P. Zhurbenko. The fungus grows on the epiphytic lichen Ochrolechia trochophora, but does not visibly damage its host. It is somewhat similar to Skyttea fusispora, but unlike that fungus, it has an orange-brown exciple that stains purple with the K test, and has shorter ascospores, typically measuring 14.7‒18.9 by 3.1‒3.9 μm.

References

Leotiomycetes
Fungi described in 2015
Lichenicolous fungi
Taxa named by Mikhail Petrovich Zhurbenko